Areal can refer to:

 An adjective pertaining to an area
 Areal, Rio de Janeiro, a municipality in Brazil
 António Areal (1934—1978), Portuguese painter
 Sofia Areal (born 1960), Portuguese painter, António Areal's daughter

See also
 Area (disambiguation)
 Areal density (computer storage) 
 Areal feature in linguistics
 Areal velocity, a term from classical mechanics
 Areal, a scrapped video game